Pagosvenator is an extinct genus of erpetosuchid from the Mid-Late Triassic Dinodontosaurus Assemblage Zone of the Santa Maria Supergroup of Brazil. The type species, Pagosvenator candelariensis, was described in 2018.

Pagosvenator is a Brazilian genus which has been allied with the ornithosuchids prior to receiving a formal description in 2018. Despite only being known from a skull and a few vertebrae and osteoderms, which were anonymously donated to the Candelária Museum in 2015, it shares similarities with several erpetosuchids. Although its description only compared it with Erpetosuchus and Parringtonia, its assignment to this family does have some support. It shares a few traits with these other genera, such as maxillary teeth at only the front of the mouth and a portion of the maxilla under the lacrimal which is higher than long.

References 

Prehistoric pseudosuchian genera
Middle Triassic archosaurs
Late Triassic archosaurs
Ladinian genera
Carnian genera
Triassic reptiles of South America
Triassic Brazil
Fossils of Brazil
Paraná Basin
Fossil taxa described in 2018